Canada Lake is a hamlet in the Town of Caroga in Fulton County, New York.

References

Hamlets in New York (state)
Hamlets in Fulton County, New York